Oğuzhan Koç (born 13 May 1985) is a Turkish singer-songwriter, comedian, actor, screenwriter, TV host and music producer.

Personal life 
He stated about his voice like east origin, "Due to, I'm from Üzümlü. Maybe I'm mix." He composed song "Erzincan" about Altıntepe fortress, where an ancient Urartian site in Üzümlü. After 1992 Erzincan earthquake, his family moved to Bursa. Other his family members dead. At 1999 İzmit earthquake, he experienced due to Bursa and Kocaeli are so close. 

For children help campaign of "ÇABA", He performed concert with Sezen Aksu and stand-up with "3 Adam". He awarded for composing the film soundtracks, "El Alem Ne Der" and "Uçanları Vurmasınlar" about women rights and inequality at the 17th Kral Music Awards.

His mother was a teacher. His father worked in a bank. He has an older brother. On 28 August 2022, he married actress Demet Özdemir.

Education and career 
He studied at the Bursa State Conservatory's Music Department for elementary school and high school. At the age of eleven, Oğuzhan Koç met comedian Eser Yenenler, writer İbrahim Büyükak and founder of Hype New Media Tolga Akış in Bursa and they started their collective career together. Also, he and İbrahim Büyükak played in BursaSpor Young Football Team for a short time. He simultaneously started to study in the Anthropology Department of Istanbul University and pursued an online education in the Business Department of Anadolu University after spending one year in the Labour Economy Department of Dokuz Eylül University.

Koç, who has been interested in performing arts from a young age, joined the BKM Theatre in 2006, with Eser Yenenler, İbrahim Büyükak, Zeynep Koçak and Tolga Akış (pr department of Bkm). He and BKM actors worked as screenwriters and performed as actors in Kanal D's theatrical comedy Çok Güzel Hareketler Bunlar, which was awarded at 36th Golden Butterfly Awards as the Best Comedy Show. In 2009, he took a role in the movie Neşeli Hayat directed by Yılmaz Erdoğan. In 2010, Koç starred in the movie titled Çok Filim Hareketler Bunlar, which was written and directed by BKM actors. 

Together with Eser Yenenler and İbrahim Büyükak, Koç presented the talk show 3 Adam between 2013 and 2017. Also, they performed stand up in Europe and Turkey.

Koç then had a leading role in the movies Yol Arkadaşım and Yol Arkadaşım 2 as Onur Güzel and Özür Dilerim as Koray which were written by İbrahim Büyükak.

Together with Gülben Ergen and Eser Yenenler, he took part in the Turkish dubbing of musical theatre Pinokyo. He was then cast as a voice actor in the animated sitcom Fırıldak Ailesi, voicing a single character together with Eser Yenenler and İbrahim Büyükak. He became one of the voice actors chosen for the animated movie Doru.

Filmography

Discography

Awards

References

External links 
 
 
 

Living people
1985 births
Turkish male stage actors
Turkish male film actors
Turkish male television actors
Turkish singer-songwriters
Turkish television presenters
Turkish male singers
People from Refahiye
21st-century Turkish male actors